Ádám Pintér (born 25 December 2001) is a Hungarian football defender who plays for Szentlőrinc.

Career
On 19 January 2023, Pintér signed a year-and-a-half contract with Szentlőrinc.

Career statistics
.

References

External links
 
 

2001 births
People from Szolnok
Sportspeople from Jász-Nagykun-Szolnok County
Living people
Hungarian footballers
Association football midfielders
Debreceni VSC players
Balmazújvárosi FC players
Kaposvári Rákóczi FC players
Szeged-Csanád Grosics Akadémia footballers
Szentlőrinci SE footballers
Nemzeti Bajnokság I players
Nemzeti Bajnokság II players